The Togo national rugby union team represents Togo in international rugby union. Togo are a member of the International Rugby Board (IRB), and have yet to play in a Rugby World Cup tournament. Togo played their first international in 2001, losing to Nigeria. They won their first match in 2003, defeating Mauritania.

Overall Record

External links
 Togo on IRB.com
 Togo on rugbydata.com
 [http://www.rugbyafrique.com/unions/

African national rugby union teams
Rugby union in Togo
National sports teams of Togo